Binda Man Bista is a Nepalese politician and Minister for Economic Affairs and Planning of Karnali Province. He is also a member of Provincial Assembly of Karnali Province belonging to the CPN (Maoist Centre). Bista, a resident of Barahatal Rural Municipality, was elected via 2017 Nepalese provincial elections from Surkhet 2(B).

Electoral history

2017 Nepalese provincial elections

References

Living people
Year of birth missing (living people)
21st-century Nepalese politicians
Members of the Provincial Assembly of Karnali Province
Communist Party of Nepal (Maoist Centre) politicians
People from Surkhet District